Plantago indica, commonly known as branched plantain, sand plantain, or black psyllium, is a flowering plant in the plantain family Plantaginaceae, and is one of a few species in the Plantago genus under the common name psyllium. The plant is native to parts of Africa, Europe, Russia, and Asia, and has been naturalized in many other areas such as Australia and North America. The plant can be found mostly in dry inland areas, such as those that are sandy, and has also naturalized on roadsides and in meadows. The plant is not used broadly as a food source, but has been cultivated for its seeds which serve a medicinal use as a laxative.

Description 
Plantago indica is an annual herb with a taproot that has an erect stem with leaves that are usually opposite but sometimes in whorls of 3, and elongated internodes between leaf sets. Glandular pubescence is found on the stems, leaves, sepals, and inflorescences. The leaves are simple and have a base that is decurrent onto the petiole, an entire or slightly dentate edge, are linear or lanceolate in shape, and can reach 2.5-5cm long and 1-3mm wide. Some leaves are modified into bracts between 0.5cm and 2cm which have a cuspidate apex and an orbicular-ovate base. The plant has a densely flowered inflorescence with flowers that have a glabrous, brownish corolla and a calyx with broadly veined, elliptic and obovate sepals. The stamens exsert above the corolla, and the anthers are yellow, ellipsoid, and 1.8-2.2mm in size. The style of the stigma is also well exserted, and the floral parts are hypogynous but extend superior to the ovary. The seeds are contained in capsules of 2. The seeds are 2.5-2.8 mm in size, black or blackish-brown, shiny, ellipsoid, and have a distinct central groove on the inner face.

Ecology 
Plantago indica is described as being native to North Africa, Southwest China, Europe, Russia, Kazakhstan, Kyrgyzstan, and Tajikistan. The plant has become broadly naturalized, identified in areas of Australia, North America, India, Japan, and Pakistan. The plant is commonly found in sandy areas such as in arid deserts and on sandy beaches, and has also been seen distributed on roadsides, and by railroad tracks.

Uses 

The seeds, known as French psyllium or black psyllium, are medicinally cultivated, along with other species under the psyllium common name, such as P. ovata, for use as a laxative for constipation and are also used to treat irritable bowel syndrome (IBS) and diarrhea by extracting the mucilage from the seed coat. The mucilage from the seeds has also been reported to lower the risk of coronary heart disease.

References 

indica
Biologically-based therapies
Medicinal plants
Flora of Africa
Medicinal plants of Africa
Flora of Asia
Medicinal plants of Asia
Flora of Europe
Medicinal plants of Europe
Flora of Australia
Medicinal plants of Australia
Flora of North America
Medicinal plants of North America